Murder City is a British television crime drama series.

Murder City may also refer to:

 Murder City: Detroit - 100 Years of Crime and Violence, a 2008 documentary film
 Dika: Murder City, a 1995 documentary film
 "Murder City", a 2009 song by Green Day from 21st Century Breakdown
 Detroit, Michigan, known as "Murder City" in the 1970s; see Hazelwood massacre

See also
 The Murder City Devils
 The Murder City Machine Guns